A saltbox house is a gable-roofed residential structure that is typically two stories in the front and one in the rear. It is a traditional New England style of home, originally timber framed, which takes its name from its resemblance to a wooden lidded box in which salt was once kept.

The structure's unequal sides and long, low rear roofline are its most distinctive features. A flat front and central chimney are also recognizable traits.

Origins

The saltbox originated in New England and is an example of American colonial architecture. Its shape evolved organically as an economical way to enlarge a house by adding a shed to a home's rear.

Original hand-riven oak clapboards are still in place on some of the earliest New England saltboxes, such as the Comfort Starr House and Ephraim Hawley House. Once part of their exteriors, they are preserved in place in attics that were created when shed-roofed additions were added onto the homes.

The style was popular for structures throughout the colonial period and into the early Republic for its ability to enlarge the footprint of an existing structure at a minimum of cost. It was most common in Massachusetts, the Connecticut Valley, and in the Western Reserve of Ohio in the period from 1620 to mid 1700s, but continued to be built until around 1820.

Saltbox homes can also be found in parts of Newfoundland and Labrador.

Catslide
The roof style is also known as a catslide roof – any roof that, in part, extends down below the main eave height, providing greater area under the roof. If the roof continues at the same pitch, it is considered a "continuous catslide".
In the United States, the term is applied to roofs on houses in the Southeast, especially stretching from Maryland south and west through Kentucky, and from early colonial times to around 1910. The term was borrowed from 17th century England where it referred to a secondary roof, often at the side of a building. In the southern US, a catslide roof was usually covering a front or rear porch, often with a less steep pitch than the main roof.

The term is applied to any roof with different eave heights, such as a house with one and a half stories above ground in the front and one story in the rear. The catslide could cover an open patio with a lower ceiling than the house, or could continue almost to the ground, creating a limited height storage area. A front vestibule could have a small catslide roof perpendicular to the main roof. A dormer could be designed with a catslide.

Construction
Characteristic of most early New England colonial houses, saltboxes were timber framed. Also known as post-and-beam construction, the technique joins large pieces of wood with mortise and tenon joints, wooden pegs, braces, or trusses. Metal nails were sparingly used, as they were an expensive commodity at the time. The exterior of a saltbox was often finished with clapboard or another wooden siding. The Josiah Day House in West Springfield, Massachusetts, is constructed of brick.

Images

See also
List of house types
Cape Cod (house)

References

External links
Saltbox Houses in the Historic American Buildings Survey
Timber-frame Houses in the Historic American Buildings Survey
Early Connecticut Houses: An Historical and Architectural Study By Norman Morrison Isham, Albert Frederic Brown

 
American architectural styles
House styles
18th-century architecture
19th-century architecture
Housing in the United States
Vernacular architecture